The Bärschwil gypsum railway was a narrow gauge railway in the Swiss canton of Solothurn. It existed from 1894 to 1952, carrying gypsum from mines in the village of Bärschwil to that village's former railway station some distance away on the Jura railway line.

The mines have now been closed and filled in, but some of the line's route through the village can be identified. Between the village and the station, much of the line's right of way is now occupied by a geologically themed hiking trail, which also crosses the four span metal girder bridge that is the line's main surviving relic.

History 
From the 19th century, Bärschwil was a source of gypsum. Initially the gypsum was extracted on the surface, but subsequently using underground mines accessed via adits. Until 1910, the mine was situated at Gupf, and when that was exhausted a new mine was opened at Kirchacker.

At first the gypsum was removed using horse and cart. In 1875, the Jura railway line was opened to the north of the village, and in 1894 the gypsum railway was constructed to link the mines to it. It had a continuous downhill gradient from the mines to the station, and loaded trains were run down this by gravity. Returning empty trains were hauled up the gradient by horses.

The line continued to operate in this manner until 1952, when it was replaced by road transport. The mines closed in 1957.

References 

Horse-drawn railways
Closed railway lines in Switzerland
Transport in the canton of Solothurn
600 mm gauge railways in Switzerland
Railway lines opened in 1894
Railway lines closed in 1952